Newton Ivan Steers Jr. (January 13, 1917 – February 11, 1993), was a U.S. Congressman who represented Maryland's 8th congressional district from January 3, 1977, to January 3, 1979.

Early life
Newton Ivan Steers Jr. was born on January 13, 1917, in Glen Ridge, New Jersey, to Newton Steers Sr. and Claire L. Steers. His father was president of the DuPont Film Manufacturing Corporation for seventeen years. Steers was the youngest of five children born to his parents: Helen Steers, who married George Van Trump Burgess, Charlotte Steers, who married Paul Van Winkle, Mrs. W. Breckinridge De Riemer, and Margaret Steers, who married L. H. Brague Jr.

Steers attended the White Plains, New York, public schools. He graduated from the Hotchkiss School in Lakeville, Connecticut, in 1935, and received a B.A. from Yale University in 1939. He obtained a Certificate of Advanced Meteorology from the Massachusetts Institute of Technology in 1943, and his J.D. degree from the Yale Law School in 1948.

Career
Steers was admitted to the New York bar (1958), and later to the District of Columbia bar (1967), and worked with the DuPont company from 1939 to 1941. During World War II, he served in United States Army Air Corps from 1941 to 1946. After the war, he worked with GAF Corp. from 1948 to 1951, and the United States Atomic Energy Commission from 1951 to 1953. He also became president of several investment companies in New York from 1953 through 1965. Steers was said to have made his fortune during the 1950s through investing in mutual funds, forming the Atomic Development Mutual Fund in 1953 with a group of friends. The fund specialized in "securities of companies participating in activities resulting from the natural sciences."

Political career
In 1962, Steers entered politics and was an unsuccessful candidate for election in 1962 to the 88th Congress. He served as Maryland Republican State chairman from 1964 to 1966. In 1967, Gov. Spiro T. Agnew appointed Steers the Maryland State insurance commissioner, which remained until 1970. In 1970, Steers became Maryland Assistant Secretary of Licensing and Regulation and a member of the Maryland State Senate, serving from 1971 to 1977. He served as a delegate to the Republican National Convention in 1964 and 1984.

In 1976, Steers was elected as a Republican to the 95th Congress over Democrat Lanny Davis and independent Robin Ficker, serving from January 3, 1977, until January 3, 1979. He ran for reelection in 1978 to the 96th Congress and lost to Democrat Michael D. Barnes, and unsuccessfully challenged Barnes in 1980. He was also an unsuccessful candidate for election as Lieutenant Governor of Maryland in 1982, losing to Democrat J. Joseph Curran, Jr. Steers was a resident of Bethesda, Maryland, until his death there in 1993.

Personal life
In 1957, Steers married Nina Gore Auchincloss (born 1937), the daughter of Hugh D. Auchincloss (1897-1976) and Nina S. Gore (1903–1978). Nina S. Gore had previously been married to Eugene Vidal, with whom she had one child, the writer Gore Vidal, Nina Gore Auchincloss's half-brother. Hugh D. Auchincloss later married Janet Lee Bouvier, the mother of Jacqueline Kennedy, who became a stepsister to Nina Gore Auchincloss. Kennedy was matron of honor at the wedding and then-Sen. John F. Kennedy was one of the groomsmen. Together, Steers and Nina Gore Auchincloss had three children:

 Hugh Auchincloss Steers (1962–1995), a painter who died of AIDS related complications
 Ivan Steers
 Burr Gore Steers (born 1965), a writer and filmmaker

Steers and Auchincloss were divorced in 1974. In 1978, he married Inge Gabriele (née Wirsich) Irwin, who he remained married to until his death. Inge had a son, Kristof Andreas Irwin, from a previous marriage who became Steers's stepson. Steers died on February 11, 1993, at his home in Bethesda, Maryland after a long battle with cancer.

References

External links

 Newton I. Steers papers at the University of Maryland libraries

1917 births
1993 deaths
20th-century American politicians
United States Army personnel of World War II
Auchincloss family
DuPont people
Republican Party Maryland state senators
People from Bethesda, Maryland
People from Glen Ridge, New Jersey
People from White Plains, New York
Massachusetts Institute of Technology School of Science alumni
Military personnel from New Jersey
Yale Law School alumni
United States Army Air Forces soldiers
Republican Party members of the United States House of Representatives from Maryland